Cristofori's Dream is David Lanz's seventh studio album, released in 1988. The album was the only Lanz album to top Billboard's "Top New Age Albums" chart as well as the only album to chart on the Billboard 200, peaking at #180.

Concept
The album was dedicated to (and named after) Bartolomeo Cristofori, who is widely  regarded to be the inventor of the piano.

Reception
William Ruhlmann of AllMusic gave the album five stars, opining "its selections have a calm elegance, as Lanz spends most of his time in the upper register of the piano delivering precise, articulated melodies".

Track listing
All songs written by David Lanz, except where noted.

Personnel
The music features the following.

 David Lanz – Bells, Composer, Piano, Producer, Synthesizer
 Steven Ray Allen – Arranger, Acoustic bass, Acoustic guitar, Electric bass, Conductor, Fretless bass, Electric guitar
 Gary Brooker, Keith Reid, Matthew Fisher – Composers
 Freeman Patterson – Cover photo
 John Morey, Barbara Richardson – Designers
 Al Swanson – Digital Assembly, Digital Editing
 Reed Ruddy, Paul Speer – Engineers
 Bill Cannon – Illustrator
 Randy Kling – Mastering
 Richard Aaron, Alex Segal, Mary Tapiro, Deborah Yamak – Cellists
 Neal Speer – Drums
 Nancy Rumbel – English horn, Oboe
 Richard Warner – Flute, Soprano sax
 Matthew Fisher – Organ
 Luis Peralta, James Reynolds – Percussion
 Jonn Serrie – Synthesizer
 Betty Agent, Karie Prescott, Ruth Sereque, Eileen Swanson – Violists
 Linda Anderson, Bryan Boughten, Deede Cook, Stephen Daniels, Ingric Fredricikson, Ingrid Fredrickson, Christine Olason, John Pilskog Marjorie Talvi – Violinists

Charts

References

1988 albums
New-age albums by American artists
Narada Productions albums